Arthur LeRoy Smith Sr. (February 13, 1886 – December 17, 1951) was a Canadian barrister, inventor and federal politician. He was born in Regina, Northwest Territories.

Smith first ran for a seat in the House of Commons of Canada as a Conservative candidate in the 1921 federal election in the East Calgary riding, he was defeated by William Irvine. He would not make another attempt at winning a seat for almost 25 years.

Smith filed a patent on an Air Heating System with the Canadian Intellectual Property Office on September 29, 1936.  He also defended Premier of Alberta John Edward Brownlee in MacMillan v. Brownlee.

Smith would make a second attempt at federal politics. This time he ran in the Calgary West riding in the 1945 federal election defeating four other candidates to win his first term in office. He would run for re-election in the 1949 federal election winning his second term by a comfortable margin. Smith would be forced to resign his seat on July 5, 1951, due to health complications. He died in Calgary five months later on December 17, 1951.

Smith's son Arthur Ryan Smith also served as a Member of Parliament and a Member of the Legislative Assembly of Alberta.

References

External links
 

1886 births
1951 deaths
Members of the House of Commons of Canada from Alberta
Progressive Conservative Party of Canada MPs